Cornelia Simone Kramer-Kramer (9 July 1939 – 9 January 2023) was a Dutch children's writer and translator.

Biography
Kramer was born in Bodegraven in 1939, as the youngest in a family of eight children. Her father was a primary school principal in Bodegraven. After primary school, she attended the gymnasium and went afterwards to music school. During her studies, Kramer worked part-time as a doctor's assistant and saleswoman in a department store.

In 1966, she started working for the VARA, at first in the music department and later in the film department. She translated many films including The BFG of Roald Dahl. In 1984 Kramer started working as a children's book author for children from the age of ten years. In addition, Kramer wrote picture books and books for younger children. Kramer included Greek mythologies in her stories.

Kramer died in 's-Graveland on 9 January 2023, at the age of 83.

References

1939 births
2023 deaths
Dutch children's writers
Dutch translators
People from Bodegraven